The Law Enforcement Command of the Islamic Republic of Iran, previously known as the Law Enforcement Force of the Islamic Republic of Iran or Disciplinary Force of the Islamic Republic of Iran, abbreviated as FARAJA, is the uniformed police force in Iran. The force was created in early 1992 by merging the Shahrbani, Gendarmerie, and Islamic Revolutionary Committees into a single force. It has more than 60,000 police personnel, including border guard personnel, and is under the direct control of the Supreme Leader Ali Khamenei who is the head of state and Commander-in-Chief of the Armed Forces.
In 2003, some 400 women became the first female members of the police force since the 1979 Iranian Revolution The Guidance Patrol, commonly called the "morality police", was a vice squad/Islamic religious police in the Law Enforcement Force of the Islamic Republic of Iran, established in 2005 with the task of arresting people who violate the Islamic dress code, usually concerning the wearing by women of hijabs covering their hair.

History 

The Persian Gendarmerie, also called the Government Gendarmerie, was the first modern highway patrol and rural police force in Persia. A paramilitary force, it also played a significant part in politics from its establishment in 1910 during the Qajar dynasty until the advent of the Pahlavi dynasty in 1921. It was active for some time in Pahlavi era. Nazmiyeh was also a Law Enforcement force in Persia, with police duties inside cities.

Intensely concerned with matters of internal security in the post-1953 environment, Mohammad Reza Pahlavi authorized the development of one of the most extensive systems of law enforcement agencies in the developing world. The Imperial Iranian Gendarmerie and the National Police (Shahrbani  or Nazmiyeh ) gained in numbers and responsibilities. The secret police organization, SAVAK, gained special notoriety for its excessive zeal in "maintaining" internal security. But as in the regular armed forces, the shah's management style virtually eliminated all coordination among these agencies. He tended to shuffle army personnel back and forth between their ordinary duties and temporary positions in internal security agencies, in order to minimize the possibility of any organized coups against the throne. Added to this list of institutional shortcomings was agencies' all- important public image, cloaked in mystery and fear.

After the 1979 Revolution, the gendarmerie, which was renamed to the Islamic Republic of Iran Gendarmerie, was numbering nearly 74,000 in 1979, was subordinate to the Ministry of Interior. Its law enforcement responsibilities extended to all rural areas and to small towns and villages of fewer than 5,000 inhabitants. The International Institute for Strategic Studies estimated its manpower at 70,000 in 1986. The Gendarmerie was dissolved in 1990 and its personnel were assigned to the INP.

The National Police of Iran operated with approximately 200,000 men in 1979, a figure that has not fluctuated much since. The National Police was also under the Ministry of Interior, and its responsibilities included all cities with more than 5,000 in population, at least 20 percent of the population. Additionally the National Police was responsible for passport and immigration procedures, issuance and control of citizens' identification cards, driver and vehicle licensing and registration, and railroad and airport policing. Some of these duties were absorbed into the Ministry of the Pasdaran during the early years of the Revolution, and cooperation between these two branches seemed extensive.

Since 1979, both these paramilitary organizations have undergone complete reorganizations. IRP leaders quickly appointed Gendarmerie and police officers loyal to the Revolution to revive and reorganize the two bodies under the Islamic Republic. Between 1979 and 1983, no fewer than seven officers were given top National Police portfolios. Colonel Khalil Samimi, appointed in 1983 by the influential Ali Akbar Nategh-Nouri, then Minister of Interior, who was credited with reorganizing the National Police according to the IRP's Islamic guidelines. The Gendarmerie followed a similar path. Seven appointments were made between 1979 and 1986, leading to a full reorganization. In addition to Brigadier General Ahmad Mohagheghi, the commander in the early republican period who was executed in late summer of 1980 and five colonels were purged. Colonel Ali Kuchekzadeh played a major role in reorganizing and strengthening the Gendarmerie after its near collapse in the early revolutionary period. The commander in 1987, Colonel Mohammad Sohrabi, had served in that position since February 1985 and was the first top officer to have risen from the ranks.

As of 1987, the National Police and the Gendarmerie reflected the ideology of the state. Despite their valuable internal security operations, the roles of both bodies were restricted by the rising influence of the Sepah and the Basij. The Gendarmerie was disbanded in 1991, along with the National Police and Islamic Revolution Committees; all three of these organizations being merged into the present-day Law Enforcement Force.

The Police–110 unit specializes in rapid-response activities in urban areas and dispersing gatherings deemed dangerous to public order. In 2003, some 400 women became the first female members of the police force since the 1978–79 Revolution.

The current commander is IRGC-born Brigadier General Hossein Ashtari, former first deputy chief of police under Esmail Ahmadi Moqaddam; he relieved his predecessor and was appointed by the Supreme Leader Ayatollah Ali Khamenei on March 9, 2015.

Per a decree issued by Supreme Leader Ali Khamenei, on 8 December 2021 Law Enforcement Force structure was promoted to that of a General Command in 2021, it was thus renamed "Law Enforcement Command of Islamic Republic of Iran".

Provincial Security Council 

The Provincial Security Council is the highest provincial security body and is made up of the justice administration chief as well as the provincial police chief; it has the task to manage matters pertaining to security. The council has a provincial jurisdiction charged of managing police issues, ranging from public security issues to handling of serious criminal cases.

Top organization 
All issues related to the Law Enforcement Force within the framework of the law are entrusted with the Interior Ministry; but in the areas of war, the authority lies with the Deputy Chief Commander of the Joint Forces. Police top officers are directly appointed by the Supreme Leader. Law Enforcement Force also consists of several different provincial deputies. Provincial commanders rank between Colonel and Brigadier General, while provincial branch heads rank Colonel.

Branches 

The Police-110 unit specializes in rapid-response activities in urban areas and dispersing gatherings deemed dangerous to public order. Marine police have 100 inshore patrol and 50 harbor boats.

The Law Enforcement Force of Islamic Republic of Iran have a number of branches, each with specialized duties:
 The Iranian Public Conscription Organization (Persian: سازمان نظام وظیفه عمومی فراجا )
 The Prevention Police of FARAJA (Persian: پلیس پیشگیری ناجا), established in 2005;
 The Intelligence and Public Security Police of FARAJA (PAVA for short: Persian پلیس اطلاعات و امنیت عمومی ناجا);
 The Traffic Police of FARAJA (Rahvar for short; Persian: پلیس راهنمایی و رانندگی ناجا), established in 1991;
 The Cyber Police of FARAJA (FATA for short: Persian پلیس فضای تولید و تبادل اطلاعات ناجا, established in 2011, is Iran's Law Enforcement Force Cyber unit;
 The Anti-Narcotics Police of FARAJA (Persian: پلیس مبارزه با مواد مخدر ناجا), is an Anti-Narcotic unit;
 The Immigration & Passport Police of FARAJA (Persian: پلیس مهاجرت و گذرنامه ناجا) deals with issues of immigration and issuing passports to Iranian citizens;
 The Diplomatic Police of FARAJA (Persian: پلیس دیپلماتیک ناجا);
 The Criminal Investigation Police of FARAJA (Persian: پلیس اگاهی ناجا) Police Āgāhi of NAJA, established in 1991;
 The Border Guard Command of FARAJA (Persian: فرماندهی مرزبانی ناجا), established in 2000, is the Iran's border guard organization and its chief is Brigadier General Qasem Rezaee;
 The Special Unit; it was involved in quelling of 2009 Iranian presidential election protests. It is responsible for suppressing riots, anti-terrorist activities, urban defence and rescuing hostages. FARAJAspecial units includes Anti-Terror Special Force("NOPO" for short). According to a former commander, the Special Unit alone has 60,000 members across the country.
 The Centre for Strategic Studies of the Iranian Law Enforcement Force, directed by Brigadier General Ahmad Reza Radan.

Guidance Patrol

The Guidance Patrol, widely known the "morality police", was a vice squad/Islamic religious police in the Law Enforcement Force of the Islamic Republic of Iran, established in 2005 and dissolved in 2022, with the task of arresting people who violated the Islamic dress code, usually concerning the wearing by women of hijabs covering their hair.On December 3rd, 2022, the Attorney General of Iran, Mohammad Jafar Montazeri, said in Qom that the police guidance patrol is not under the supervision of the judiciary system and it is closed now from where it was begun first.

Budget
Ghavamin Bank was financed by police pension fund.
It controls FARAJA Cooperation Bonyad.

Chiefs of Law Enforcement Force

Branch seals

Equipment

Weapons 
 Heckler & Koch MP5
 SIG Sauer P220
 SIG Sauer P226
 Heckler & Koch HK21
 Smith & Wesson Model 10
 Dragunov
 Electroshock weapon
 AK-47
 Uzi
 FIM-92 Stinger
 Remington 870
 PK machine gun
 M79 grenade launcher
 DShK

Cars 
 Samand
 Mercedes-Benz C 240
 Mercedes-Benz E 240
 Nissan Xterra N50
 Toyota Land Cruiser 100 Series
 Renault Mégane
 Mitsubishi Pajero
 Toyota Hilux Sixth generation and Seventh generation
 Volkswagen Transporter
 Kia Forte TD
  Hyundai Santa Fe DM
 Nissan Teana
 Suzuki Grand Vitara
 Toyota Corolla E150
 Citroën Xantia
 Peugeot 207
 Peugeot 405

Formerly used cars
 Nissan Patrol 160 Series
 Toyota Cressida

Motorcycles 
 BMW R1200RT
 Honda CMX250C
 Honda CBX750

Aircraft 
 Dassault Falcon 20
 HESA IrAn-140
 Aero Commander 690
 Bell 205
 Bell 206
 Bell 212
 Bell 214
 Mil Mi-17
 Cessna 206
 Dorna D-139 Blue Bird
 Cessna 185

See also 

 Crime in Iran
 Death of Mahsa Amini
 Rank insignia of the Iranian military
 Zahra Bani Yaghoub
 Zahra Kazemi

Notes

References

External links 

 Iranian police force
 Iranian traffic police
 LOC Iran study
 Iranian Law Enforcement Forces (LEF)

 
 
Government agencies established in 1991
1991 establishments in Iran